David Richard Sloan is a Canadian politician, who represented the electoral district of Whitehorse West in the Yukon Legislative Assembly from 1996 to 2000. He was a member of the Yukon New Democratic Party caucus.

He subsequently joined the Yukon Liberal Party and contested the new electoral district of Mountainview in the 2011 election, but was not re-elected to the legislature.

References

Yukon New Democratic Party MLAs
Living people
Politicians from Whitehorse
1949 births